This is a list of video games published and/or distributed by Zushi Games. It includes all of their titles that were published under their former name of Zoo Digital Publishing.

Main titles
Actua Pool (2007) Nintendo DS
 Adventures To Go (2009) PlayStation Portable
Aero the Acro-Bat (2003) Game Boy Advance
Alien Hominid (2005) Game Boy Advance, Mobile phone, PlayStation 2, Xbox
The Aly & AJ Adventure (2008) Nintendo DS
 American Chopper (2004) PlayStation 2, Windows, Xbox
 American Chopper 2: The Full Throttle (2006) PlayStation 2, Xbox
Arctic Tale (2008) Nintendo DS, Wii
 At the Races Presents Gallop Racer (2003) PlayStation 2
 ATV Thunder Ridge Riders (2006) Game Boy Advance
 ATV Thunder Ridge Riders & Monster Trucks Mayhem (2008) Nintendo DS
 B.C. Kings (2010) Windows
B-17: Fortress in the Sky (2007) Nintendo DS
Balls of Fury (2007) Nintendo DS, Wii
Barnyard Blast: Swine of the Night (2008) PlayStation Portable
Beanotown Racing (2003) Windows
Betty Boop's Double Shift (2008) Nintendo DS
Bicycle Casino (2005) Xbox
Bigfoot: Collision Course (2009) Nintendo DS, Wii, Windows
Big Mutha Truckers (2005) Game Boy Advance, Nintendo DS
 Blockids (2004) PlayStation
BlowOut (2004) PlayStation 2, Windows
 Board Game Classics: Backgammon & Chess & Draughts (2005) Game Boy Advance
 Cabela's Big Game Hunter (2002) PlayStation 2
Cabela's Big Game Hunter 2005 Adventures (2004) Game Boy Advance, PlayStation 2, Xbox
Cabela's Big Game Hunter 2006 Trophy Season (2006) Windows
Cabela's Dangerous Hunts (2004) PlayStation 2, Xbox
Cabela's Dangerous Hunts 2 (2005) Windows
Cabela's Outdoor Adventures (2006) PlayStation 2, Xbox
Calvin Tucker's Redneck Jamboree (2009) Wii
 Casino Blackjack (2007) Windows
 Casino Poker (2007) Windows
Caterpillar Construction Tycoon (2006) Windows
 Centipede / Breakout / Warlords] (2005) Game Boy Advance
Chess Crusade (2008) PlayStation 2, Wii, Windows
Chicken Shoot (2007) Nintendo DS, Wii
 Chicken Shoot 1 (2005) Game Boy Advance
 Chicken Shoot 2 (2005) Game Boy Advance
 Chicken Blaster (2010) Nintendo DS, Wii
ChoroQ (2005) PlayStation 2
 Combat: Task Force 121 (2006) Xbox
 Command and Destroy (2008) Nintendo DS
Dead to Rights (2004) Game Boy Advance
Deal or No Deal: Special Edition (2010) Nintendo DS, Wii
Defender of the Crown (2004) Game Boy Advance
 Defender of the Crown: Heroes Live Forever (2007) Windows
Defendin' de Penguin (2010) Nintendo DS, Wii
 Double Sequence: The Q-Virus Invasion (2008) Nintendo DS
Dr. Seuss: How the Grinch Stole Christmas (2007) Nintendo DS
 Ed's Farm (2008) Nintendo DS
Ed, Edd n Eddy: Jawbreakers! (2002) Game Boy Advance
 Exodus from the Earth (2010) Windows
 Family Gameshow (2009) Wii
 Food Coach: Healthy Living Made Easy (2010) Nintendo DS
Ford Racing 3 (2005) Game Boy Advance, Nintendo DS
Freedom Wings (2007) Nintendo DS
Freekstyle (2003) Game Boy Advance
 Gadget Racers (2003) Game Boy Advance, PlayStation 2
Geki-Oh Shooting King: Shienryu (2004) PlayStation
Gadget Racers (2003) GameCube
Gallop Racer 2 (2005) PlayStation 2
Garfield's Fun Fest (2008) Nintendo DS
Garfield Gets Real (2009) Nintendo DS
 Gauntlet & Rampart (2005) Game Boy Advance
Gekido Advance: Kintaro's Revenge (2002) Game Boy Advance
Guilty Gear Isuka (2006) Windows
Guilty Gear X2#Reload (2004) PlayStation 2, Windows, Xbox
 Guinness World Records 50th Anniversary (2004) DVD player
Gun Metal (2003) Windows
 Harlem Globetrotters: World Tour (2006) Game Boy Advance, Nintendo DS
 Hot Wheels: All Out (2006) Game Boy Advance
 Hot Wheels: Stunt Track Challenge / World Race (2006) Game Boy Advance
 Hot Wheels Ultimate Racing (2007) PlayStation Portable
 Indianapolis 500 Evolution (2010) Windows, Xbox 360
 Interactive Championship Challenge (2003) DVD player
I-Ninja (2004) Windows
Jeep Thrills (2008) PlayStation 2, Wii
Juka and the Monophonic Menace (2006) Game Boy Advance
 Jig-a-Pix Love is ... (2010) Nintendo DS
 Jig-a-Pix Pets (2009) Nintendo DS
 Jig-a-Pix Wild World (2009) Nintendo DS
 Jig-a-Pix Wonderful World (2009) Nintendo DS
 Kazoo Home Creative Studio (2002) Windows
Kill Switch (2004) Game Boy Advance
 Killer 3D Pool (2005) Game Boy Advance
L.A. Rush (2006) Windows
Lionel Trains: On Track (2007) Nintendo DS
Love Is...In Bloom (2009) Nintendo DS, Wii
M&M's Break' Em (2007) Game Boy Advance, Nintendo DS
M&M's Kart Racing (2008) Nintendo DS, Wii
Manchester United Interactive (2004) DVD player
Marble Madness / Klax (2005) Game Boy Advance
March of the Penguins (2007) Game Boy Advance, Nintendo DS
Margots Bepuzzled! (2009) Nintendo DS, Wii
Matchbox Missions: Air, Land & Sea Rescue / Emergency Response (2006) Game Boy Advance
Mark Davis Pro Bass Challenge (2003) PlayStation 2
Medal of Honor: Underground (2003) Game Boy Advance
Midway Arcade Treasures (2004) Windows
Midway Arcade Treasures Deluxe Edition (2006) Windows
Millipede & Super Breakout & Lunar Lander (2005) Game Boy Advance
Monopoly (2004) Game Boy Advance
Monster Pals (2010) Nintendo DS, Wii
Monster Trucks Mayhem (2006) Game Boy Advance
Ms. Pac-Man Maze Madness (2004) Game Boy Advance
Ms. Pac-Man Maze Madness / Pac-Man World (2005) Game Boy Advance
Need for Speed: Porsche Unleashed (2004) Game Boy Advance
North American Hunting Extravaganza (2009) Wii
Oktoberfest (2009) Nintendo DS
Original Frisbee Disc Sports: Ultimate & Golf (2007) Nintendo DS
Pac-Man Pinball Advance (2005) Game Boy Advance
Pac-Man World (2004) Game Boy Advance
Pac-Man World 2 (2005) Game Boy Advance
Paperboy / Rampage (2005) Game Boy Advance
Payback (2004) Game Boy Advance
Polly Pocket: Super Splash Island (2006) Game Boy Advance
Pong & Asteroids & Yar's Revenge (2005) Game Boy Advance
Pool Shark 2 (2004) PlayStation 2, Windows, Xbox
Postal 2: Share the Pain (2003) Windows
Powerdrome (2005) Windows
Premier Manager 2002/2003 Season (2003) PlayStation 2, Windows
Premier Manager 2003-04 (2003) Game Boy Advance, PlayStation 2, WindowsPremier Manager 2004-2005 (2004) Game Boy Advance, PlayStation 2, WindowsPremier Manager 2005-2006 (2005) Game Boy Advance, PlayStation 2, WindowsPremier Manager 2006-2007 (2006) PlayStation 2, WindowsPremier Manager 3 (2004) WindowsPremier Manager 08 (2007) PlayStation 2, WindowsPremier Manager 09 (2008) PlayStation 2, WindowsPremier Manager '10 (2009) WindowsPrincess Natasha: Student, Secret Agent, Princess (2006) Game Boy Advance, Nintendo DSPsi-Ops: The Mindgate Conspiracy (2005) WindowsPuzzle Kingdoms (2009) Nintendo DS, Wii, WindowsR-Type III: The Third Lightning (2004) Game Boy AdvanceRacing Gears Advance (2004) Game Boy AdvanceRapala Pro Fishing (2004) Game Boy Advance, PlayStation 2, Windows, XboxReal Estate Empire (2007) WindowsReel Fishing: Angler's Dream (2010) WiiReel Fishing: The Great Outdoors (2006) PlayStation PortableRoad Rash: Jail Break (2003) Game Boy AdvanceRobin Hood: Defender of the Crown (2004) WindowsRock 'Em Sock 'Em Robots (2006) Game Boy AdvanceRuff Trigger: The Vanocore Conspiracy (2006) PlayStation 2Samurai Jack: The Amulet of Time (2005) Game Boy AdvanceScrabble Scramble (2005) Game Boy AdvanceSea Monsters: A Prehistoric Adventure (2007) Nintendo DS, PlayStation 2, WiiSeaWorld Adventure Parks Tycoon 2 (2006) WindowsShining Stars: Super Starcade (2008) Nintendo DSShowtime Championship Boxing (2008) Nintendo DS, WiiSimCity 2000 (2003) Game Boy AdvanceSkate City Heroes (2009) WiiSmashing Drive (2005) Game Boy AdvanceSmileyWorld Island Challenge (2009) Nintendo DS, WiiSnood 2: On Vacation (2005) Game Boy Advance, Nintendo DSSpy Hunter & Super Sprint (2005) Game Boy AdvanceSteel Empire (2005) Game Boy AdvanceStoked (2009) Xbox 360Story Hour: Adventures (2009) WiiStory Hour: Fairy Tales (2009) WiiStreet Jam Basketball (2004) Game Boy AdvanceStreet Racing Syndicate (2005) Game Boy AdvanceSudeki (2005) WindowsSudokumaniacs (2006) Nintendo DSThe Suffering (2004) WindowsTelly Addicts (2005) DVD playerToy Golf (2006) WindowsToy Golf Extreme (2008) PlayStation 2, WindowsTurnabout (2004) PlayStationUno & Skip-Bo (2006) Game Boy AdvanceUno 52 (2007) Game Boy Advance, Nintendo DSUno Free Fall (2007) Game Boy AdvanceUno & Skip-Bo & Uno Free Fall (2007) Nintendo DSWade Hixton's Counter Punch (2004) Game Boy AdvanceWho Wants to be a Millionaire (2002) Game Boy AdvanceWho Wants to be a Millionaire? 2nd Edition (2004) Game Boy AdvanceWho Wants To Be A Millionaire DVD Game (2004) DVD playerWho Wants To Be A Millionaire: Interactive: 2nd Edition (2004) DVD playerWho Wants to Be a Millionaire? Junior (2005) Game Boy AdvanceWiffle Ball (2007) Nintendo DSWings (2004) Game Boy AdvanceYamaha Supercross (2009) Nintendo DS, Wii, Windows

Zoo Classics
These titles are reissues of ex-Gremlin Interactive titles.
 Actua Golf 3 (PlayStation)
 Actua Ice Hockey (PlayStation)
 Actua Ice Hockey 2 (Microsoft Windows)
 Actua Pool (PlayStation)
 Actua Soccer 3 (PlayStation, Microsoft Windows)
 Actua Tennis (PlayStation, Microsoft Windows)
 Buggy (PlayStation, Microsoft Windows)
 Gekido: Urban Fighters (PlayStation)
 Hardcore 4X4 (PlayStation)
 Hogs of War (PlayStation)
 Judge Dredd (PlayStation)
 Loaded (PlayStation)
 Motorhead (PlayStation)
 N2O (PlayStation)
 Premier Manager 3 (Microsoft Windows)
 Premier Manager 2000'' (PlayStation)

See also

GreenScreen Interactive Software, Zushi's former parent company

External links
Zoo Digital Publishing website

Zushi Games